Bertram van Munster (born 1940) is a Dutch-born American co-creator and executive producer of The Amazing Race. He is also the creator of Profiles from the Front Line and was the Executive Producer on Oprah's Big Give and Take the Money and Run.

Van Munster's television formats and productions have been sold and produced worldwide in territories including India, Africa, The Middle East, Australia, the Asia Pacific region, Israel and throughout Latin America and China.

His productions, although created for the US market, maintain international TV sensibilities. He has longstanding relationships with all major US television network and cable companies.

Van Munster is president and CEO of Worldrace Productions Inc, Profiles Television Productions LLC, and Earthview Inc (all based in Los Angeles, California).  His companies have worked in association with Jerry Bruckheimer Television for The Amazing Race and other TV series currently in production; as well as in partnership with Active TV Asia, based in Singapore.

Credits

Television

 The Amazing Race (2001–present) TV Series (executive producer)
 The Quest (2014) TV series (executive producer)
 The Great Escape (2012) TV series (executive producer)
 Take the Money and Run (2011) TV series (executive producer)
 The Big Give (2007) TV series (executive producer)
 Raw Nature (2007) TV series (executive producer)
 Profiles from the Front Line (2003) TV series (executive producer)
 Wild Things (1998) TV series (executive producer)
 Cops (1989–present) TV Series (co-producer / field producer)

Awards and nominations

Primetime Emmy Awards
The Primetime Emmy Awards are awarded annually by the Academy of Television Arts & Sciences. Bertram has been nominated for twenty-one Emmy awards and won nine.

|-
| align="center"| 2015 || The Amazing Race || Outstanding Reality Competition Program || 
|-
| align="center"| 2015 || The Amazing Race || Outstanding Directing For Nonfiction Programming || 
|-
| align="center"| 2014 || The Amazing Race || Outstanding Reality Competition Program || 
|-
| align="center"| 2013 || The Amazing Race || Outstanding Reality Competition Program || 
|-
| align="center"| 2012 || The Amazing Race || Outstanding Reality Competition Program || 
|-
| align="center"| 2012 || The Amazing Race || Outstanding Directing For Nonfiction Programming || 
|-
| align="center"| 2011 || The Amazing Race || Outstanding Reality Competition Program || 
|-
| align="center"| 2011 || The Amazing Race || Outstanding Directing For Nonfiction Programming || 
|-
| align="center"| 2010 || The Amazing Race || Outstanding Reality Competition Program || 
|-
| align="center"| 2010 || The Amazing Race || Outstanding Directing For Nonfiction Programming || 
|-
| align="center"| 2009 || The Amazing Race || Outstanding Reality Competition Program || 
|-
| align="center"| 2009 || The Amazing Race || Outstanding Directing For Nonfiction Programming || 
|-
| align="center"| 2008 || The Amazing Race || Outstanding Reality Competition Program || 
|-
| align="center"| 2008 || The Amazing Race || Outstanding Directing For Nonfiction Programming || 
|-
| align="center"| 2007 || The Amazing Race || Outstanding Reality Competition Program || 
|-
| align="center"| 2006 || The Amazing Race || Outstanding Reality Competition Program || 
|-
| align="center"| 2005 || The Amazing Race || Outstanding Reality Competition Program || 
|-
| align="center"| 2004 || The Amazing Race || Outstanding Reality Competition Program || 
|-
| align="center"| 2003 || The Amazing Race || Outstanding Reality Competition Program || 
|-
| align="center"| 1994 || Cops || Outstanding Informational Series || 
|-
| align="center"| 1993 || Cops || Outstanding Informational Series || 
|-

Directors Guild of America Awards
The Directors Guild of America Awards are awarded annually by the Directors Guild of America. Bertram has been nominated for nine DGA awards and won one.

|-
| align="center"| 2015 || The Quest Episode: "The Quest: One True Hero" || Outstanding Directorial Achievement in Reality Programs || 
|-
| align="center"| 2014 || The Amazing Race Episode: "Beards in the Wind" || Outstanding Directorial Achievement in Reality Programs || 
|-
| align="center"| 2012 || The Amazing Race Episode: "You Don't Get Paid Unless You Win?" || Outstanding Directorial Achievement in Reality Programs || 
|-
| align="center"| 2011 || The Amazing Race Episode: "I Think We're Fighting the Germans, Right?" || Outstanding Directorial Achievement in Reality Programs || 
|-
| align="center"| 2010 || The Amazing Race Episode: "Don't Let A Cheese Hit Me" || Outstanding Directorial Achievement in Reality Programs || 
|-
| align="center"| 2009 || The Amazing Race Episode: "#1303" || Outstanding Directorial Achievement in Reality Programs || 
|-
| align="center"| 2008 || The Amazing Race Episode: "#1110" || Outstanding Directorial Achievement in Reality Programs || 
|-
| align="center"| 2007 || The Amazing Race Episode: "#1002" || Outstanding Directorial Achievement in Reality Programs || 
|-
| align="center"| 2007 || The Amazing Race Episode: "#805" || Outstanding Directorial Achievement in Reality Programs || 
|-

Producers Guild of America Awards
The Producers Guild of America Awards are awarded annually by the Producers Guild of America. Bertram has been nominated for twelve PGA awards and won three.

|-
| align="center"| 2015 || The Amazing Race || Outstanding Producer of Competition Television || 
|-
| align="center"| 2014 || The Amazing Race || Outstanding Producer of Competition Television || 
|-
| align="center"| 2013 || The Amazing Race || Outstanding Producer of Competition Television || 
|-
| align="center"| 2012 || The Amazing Race || Outstanding Producer of Competition Television || 
|-
| align="center"| 2011 || The Amazing Race || Outstanding Producer of Live Entertainment & Competition Television || 
|-
| align="center"| 2010 || The Amazing Race || Outstanding Producer of Live Entertainment & Competition Television || 
|-
| align="center"| 2009 || The Amazing Race || Outstanding Producer of Live Entertainment & Competition Television || 
|-
| align="center"| 2007 || The Amazing Race || Outstanding Producer of Non-Fiction Television || 
|-
| align="center"| 2006 || The Amazing Race for The Amazing Race 7|| Outstanding Producer of Non-Fiction Television || 
|-
| align="center"| 2006 || The Amazing Race for The Amazing Race 6 || Outstanding Producer of Non-Fiction Television || 
|-
| align="center"| 2005 || The Amazing Race || Outstanding Producer of Non-Fiction Television || 
|-
| align="center"| 2004 || The Amazing Race || Outstanding Producer of Reality/Game/Informational Series Television || 
|-

References

External links
 
 

1940 births
Living people
Dutch emigrants to the United States
American television producers
American reality television producers
Directors Guild of America Award winners
American television directors
Primetime Emmy Award winners